Lilian Fournier (born 18 May 1998) is a French professional footballer who plays as a right winger for Championnat National 3 club Sarre-Union.

Career
Fournier made his debut for the Ligue 1 side in a 3–1 loss to Saint-Étienne on 14 October 2017. In January 2019, he moved to Sedan.

References

External links
 
 
 
 FC Metz Profile

Living people
1998 births
Association football midfielders
French footballers
FC Metz players
CS Sedan Ardennes players
AS Beauvais Oise players
US Sarre-Union players
Ligue 1 players
Championnat National 2 players
Championnat National 3 players
People from Forbach
Footballers from Grand Est
Sportspeople from Moselle (department)